Chris Ingram (born 7 July 1994 in Manchester) is a British rally driver. In 2019, Ingram became the first British driver to win the European Rally Championship (2019) in 52 years since Vic Elford.

He won the 2012 Motor Sports Association Young Driver of the Year Award. He is a three time winner of the European Rally Championship Colin McRae Flat Out Award on the Circuit of Ireland Rally 2014, Rallye Açores 2015, and Rally Liepaja in 2017, and also won the Richard Burns Trophy on Wales Rally GB in 2017 for winning the Two-Wheel drive class.
Ingram signed with Peugeot UK in August 2014 for the European Rally Championship driving a Peugeot 208 R2, which saw him become the youngest manufacturer-backed rally driver since Richard Burns. After two seasons with Peugeot, in January 2016 Ingram signed with German factory team Opel Motorsport and won the FIA ERC 3 title scoring five-consecutive podiums. In 2017 he won the FIA European Rally Championship Under 27 Junior title after three victories enabling him to step up into four-wheel drive for season 2018.

Career

Rallying

Early career 
Ingram began rallying aged 15 in the F1000 British Junior Rally Championship.
In his debut season 2010, he finished second, and went on to take the championship in 2011 winning 6 from 7 rounds.
When Ingram turned 17 he gained his road driving licence and competed in his first forest rally a few weeks later, finishing 1st in the RF 1400 class in the same Junior Championship winning 1000cc Citroën Sport C1

Age 17 Ingram made his debut in the 2012 British Rally Championship in a Renault Sport Twingo R2.
He won the Renault Sport R2 Twingo Trophy. He piloted the official Renault Sport Clio R3 on Rallye du Var, finishing 5th in the Renault Challenge.
Shortly after the event Ingram was nominated to take part in the Motor Sports Association Young Driver Shootout, against four young racing drivers.
After a day of varied tests Ingram was crowned the MSA Young Driver of the Year and has become the only rally driver to win the award, judged by Robert Reid and David Brabham amongst others.

In 2013 after his debut French Rally, he competed in the European Rally Championship Ypres Rally. He was part of the Renault JB Malherbe Racing Spirit team with Max Vatanen, the son of Rally legend Ari Vatanen.
In the French Rally Championship, Ingram finished on the Renault podium on Rallye Mont-Blanc and Rallye du Touquet.
Towards the end of the year Ingram made his World Rally Championship debut finishing 1st place in the RC4 category.

In 2014, Ingram entered the inaugural European Rally Championship Junior series and won the Colin McRae Flat Out Award after crashing out from the lead of the ERC Juniors in the Circuit of Ireland Rally. On Rallye Açores, Ingram finished 2nd Junior. 
In August, Ingram joined with Peugeot UK driving a Peugeot 208 R2.

Ingram and his French co-driver Gabin Moreau scored their first class win for Peugeot at the WRC Wales Rally GB taking victory in the RC4 class by a convincing 2 minutes and 22 seconds.

Chris Ingram and Gabin Moreau signed up for a full season in the European Rally Championship Junior series, which consisted of rounds in Latvia, Northern Ireland, The Azores, Belgium, Estonia and Czech Republic. After a podium in ERC Junior on the Circuit of Ireland Rally, on Rallye Açores, Ingram took his first ERC Junior victory and won the Colin McRae 'Flat Out Award' for the second time in his career.

Ingram and Moreau entered the WRC Wales GB rally with the Autosport Technology team, making their debut in WRC3 and JuniorWRC, driving a Citroen DS3. Running 2nd in both classes, after completing 17 of the 19 stage event, they retired in a watersplash whilst in transit to the penultimate stage.

FIA Junior European Rally Championship 

Ingram signed with Opel Motorsport in January to remain competing in the European Junior series. Moreau left Ingram to compete in the 2016 World Rally Championship with Stéphane Lefebvre. Ingram scored five-consecutive podiums in the ERC Junior and ERC 3 categories including a victory at the Barum Czech Rally Zlín to secure his first FIA title - the FIA European Rally Championship two wheel drive category (ERC3).

For the 2017 season Opel Motorsport fielded a three-car junior team with Tamara Molinaro and Jari Huttunen joining Ingram. 
Ingram won the first two rounds in the Azores and Gran Canaria, and the final round in Rally Liepaja to win the 2017 FIA European Rally Championship Junior Under 27 and ERC3 titles.

FIA European Rally Championship 

In 2018 Ingram joined German-based team Toksport WRT with co-driver Ross Whittock who with him secured the junior title. They competed in their debut season of four-wheel-drive competition in a Skoda Fabia R5. On the first round in the Azores, they finished 4th overall and 1st ERC Junior Under 28. In September, Ingram third in WRC2 on his WRC2 debut at Rally Turkey and finished 9th overall, one place ahead of Sebastien Ogier.

Toksport retained Ingram and Whittock for the 2019 season where they went on to win the FIA European Rally Championship, becoming the first British crew to do so in 52 years.

Results

WRC results 

* Season still in progress.

WRC-2 results 
In the 2022 Acropolis Rally in Greece Ingram finished the first short stage tenth and then dropped down the order in subsequent stages which included running of the road in one. In the eighth stage when in twenty fifth position he lost control, rolled the car and abandoned.

WRC-3 results 

* Season still in progress.

JWRC results

ERC results

References

External links

Official website

1994 births
Living people
British rally drivers
European Rally Championship drivers
People from Altrincham
Peugeot Sport drivers
Toksport WRT drivers